Garcia Live Volume One is an album by the Jerry Garcia Band.  It contains the complete early show and late show performed on March 1, 1980, at the Capitol Theatre in Passaic, New Jersey.  It was released on February 19, 2013, by ATO Records, in two formats — as a three-disc CD, and as a digital download.  The album is the first of a series of archival concert releases called Garcia Live.

At the time of the Capitol Theatre concerts, the members of the Jerry Garcia Band were Jerry Garcia on guitar and vocals, Ozzie Ahlers on keyboards and vocals, John Kahn on bass, and Johnny de Foncesca on drums.  At the late show, Robert Hunter sat in with the band on two songs that he wrote.  The concerts were recorded using a 24-track mobile recording truck, and the early show was broadcast on WNEW-FM radio.

The cover of the album features a drawing of Tiger, one of Garcia's guitars.

Garcia Live Volume One was released as a five-disc vinyl LP in a limited edition of 5,000 copies on November 28, 2019, as part of Record Store Day Black Friday.

Critical reception

On Allmusic, Fred Thomas wrote, "Recorded in 1980 at the Capitol Theatre in Passaic, New Jersey, the extensive set list includes only a few Garcia/Dead staples ('Deal', 'Sugaree'), but branches out into more eclectic territory with massively jammed-out versions of covers ranging from the Beatles to Jimmy Cliff. Grateful Dead lyricist Robert Hunter joins the band for an encore including 'Tiger Rose' and 'Promontory Rider'."

Track listing
Disc 1
Early show:
"Sugaree" (Jerry Garcia, Robert Hunter) – 14:33
"Catfish John" (Bob McDill, Allen Reynolds) – 9:56
"How Sweet It Is (To Be Loved by You)" (Brian Holland, Lamont Dozier, Eddie Holland) – 9:05
"Simple Twist of Fate" (Bob Dylan) – 16:16
Disc 2
Early show continued:
"Sitting in Limbo" (Jimmy Cliff, Guillermo Bright-Plummer) – 12:40
"That's All Right" (Arthur Crudup) – 8:09
"Deal" (Garcia, Hunter) – 8:22
Late show:
"Mission in the Rain" (Garcia, Hunter) – 12:50
"That's What Love Will Make You Do" (Henderson Thigpen, James Banks, Eddy Marion) – 8:56
Disc 3
Late show continued:
"Russian Lullaby" (Irving Berlin) – 15:39
"The Harder They Come" (Cliff) – 11:47
"Tiger Rose" (Hunter) – 4:10
"Promontory Rider" (Hunter) – 6:10
"Midnight Moonlight" (Peter Rowan) – 8:39
"Dear Prudence" (John Lennon, Paul McCartney) – 10:22

Personnel

Jerry Garcia Band
Jerry Garcia – guitar, vocals
Ozzie Ahlers – keyboards, vocals
John Kahn – bass
Johnny de Foncesca – drums

Additional musicians
Robert Hunter – acoustic guitar, harmonica, vocals on "Tiger Rose", "Promontory Rider"

Production
Produced for release by Marc Allan, Joe Gastwirt
Original recordings produced by Jerry Garcia
Executive producer: Coran Capshaw
Mixing: Jeff Peters
Mix assistant: Spencer Guerra
Mastering: Joe Gastwirt
Art direction, design, illustration: Ryan Corey
Photography: Bob Minkin, Tom Dunning
Liner notes: David Gans

References

Jerry Garcia Band live albums
2013 live albums
ATO Records live albums